Joseph Birds (29 October 1887 – 28 April 1966) was an English professional footballer who played as a goalkeeper. Despite not being particularly tall for his position, he was described as extremely agile and a good shot-stopper. He started his career in non-league football with Hazel Grove before moving to Football League Second Division side Stockport County in 1910. He moved to Macclesfield in 1913 and made 55 appearances prior to the outbreak of the First World War. During the conflict, Birds played as a wartime guest for Manchester City. After the war, he made a further 23 appearances for Stockport before moving to Third Division North outfit Nelson in the summer of 1922.

Birds made his debut for Nelson on 26 August 1922 in the 2–6 defeat away to Bradford Park Avenue. The team conceded only 10 goals at home in the league all season as they achieved promotion to the Second Division in 1922–23. In a higher league, Birds found first team opportunities limited, playing four times at the start of the 1923–24 campaign before being replaced by former Portsmouth goalkeeper Harry Abbott. Birds left Nelson in the summer of 1924 and subsequently retired from professional football.

Personal life 
Birds was married and served as an acting corporal in the Royal Garrison Artillery during the First World War. His brother Walter was killed in action in France in June 1917.

References

1887 births
1966 deaths
English footballers
Association football goalkeepers
Macclesfield Town F.C. players
Stockport County F.C. players
Nelson F.C. players
English Football League players
Manchester City F.C. wartime guest players
People from Derbyshire Dales (district)
Footballers from Derbyshire
British Army personnel of World War I
Royal Garrison Artillery soldiers
Military personnel from Derbyshire